Félix de Pomés (5 February 1892 – 17 July 1969) was a Spanish footballer, fencer and film actor. In football, he represented Catalonia and played for clubs including FC Barcelona and RCD Espanyol in the 1910s, during the sport's amateur era in the country. He competed at the 1924 and 1928 Summer Olympics in fencing. Later, he appeared in 72 films between 1928 and 1967.

His daughter was the actress Isabel de Pomés.

Selected filmography

 The Great Adventuress (1928) - Teddy Bill
 Der Henker (1928)
 The Secret Courier (1928) - Norbert de la Môle
 The Smuggler's Bride of Mallorca (1929) - Polizeileutnant de Roya
 High Treason (1929) - Nimirski
 Doña mentiras (1930) - Robero Deval
 El secreto del doctor (1930) - Richard Garson
 Toda una vida (1930) - John Ashmore
 La fiesta del diablo (1931) - Mark Stone
 Sombras del circo (1931) - Nick Pogli
 Body and Soul (1931) - Comandante Knowles
 Esclavas de la moda (1931) - David Morton
 Mamá (1931) - Mauricio
 Pax (1932)
 Alala (1934)
 Doña Francisquita (1934)
 Rataplán (1935)
 Nuevos ideales (1936) - El industrial
 Hombres contra hombres (1937)
 Aurora de esperanza (1937) - Juan
 Liberación (1937)
 Las cinco advertencias de Satanás (1938)
 Usted tiene ojos de mujer fatal (1939)
 El deber (1939)
 Pilar Guerra (1941)
 Vidas cruzadas (1942) - Ricardo
 La patria chica (1943) - Míster Blay
 Santander, la ciudad en llamas (1944) - Don Pedro Bárcenas
 The Tower of the Seven Hunchbacks (1944) - Don Robinson de Mantua
 ¡Culpable! (1945) - Director del penal
 Ramsa (1946)
 Noche sin cielo (1947) - Esteban
 Don Juan de Serrallonga (1949) - Carlos de Torrellas
 Life in Shadows (1949) - Sr. Durán
 Doce horas de vida (1949) - Andrés
 Paz (1949) - Comandante en jefe vencido
 A Thief Has Arrived (1950)
 Child of the Night (1950) - Barrière
 El centauro (1950)
 The King's Mail (1951) - Félix Picardo de Peñafiel
 The Evil Forest (1951) - Klingsor
 María Morena (1951) - Juan Montoya
 Ley del mar (1952)
 Younger Brother (1953)
 Eleven Pairs of Boots (1954) - Quijano
 He Died Fifteen Years Ago (1954) - Jefe de policía
 The Island Princess (1954) - Guanazteml
 The Other Life of Captain Contreras (1955) - Marqués del Darro
 Marta (1955)
 El hombre que veía la muerte (1955)
 The Cock Crow (1955) - Obispo
 Thunderstorm (1956) - Domingo Ribas
 The Pride and the Passion (1957) - Bishop
 El aventurero (1957) - Inspector Gomez
 Aquellos tiempos del cuplé (1958) - Coronel Jacinto
 La vida por delante (1958) - Padre de Josefina
 La muralla (1958)
 Habanera (1958)
 El Salvador (1959)
 El redentor (1959)
 Ten Ready Rifles (1959) - Coronel García Zapata
 John Paul Jones (1959) - French Chamberlain
 La vida alrededor (1959) - Padre de Josefina
 College Boarding House (1959) - Don Juan
 Solomon and Sheba (1959) - Egyptian General (uncredited)
 Quanto sei bella Roma (1959)
 Muerte al amanecer (1959)
 La rana verde (1960)
 King of Kings (1961) - Joseph of Arimathea
 La spada del Cid (1962)
 Rogelia (1962) - Duque
 El diablo también llora (1965)
 Lost Command (1966) - Aged Speaker
 Una historia de amor (1967)

References

External links
 
 

1892 births
1969 deaths
Male actors from Barcelona
Spanish male film actors
Spanish male silent film actors
20th-century Spanish male actors
Spanish male fencers
Olympic fencers of Spain
Fencers at the 1924 Summer Olympics
Fencers at the 1928 Summer Olympics
Sportspeople from Barcelona
Spanish footballers
Footballers from Catalonia
Association football midfielders
FC Barcelona players
RCD Espanyol footballers
Catalonia international footballers